The following is the list of squads for each of the 10 teams competing in the 2007 FIBA Americas Championship, held in Las Vegas, Nevada between August 22 and September 2, 2007.  Each team selected a squad of 12 players for the tournament.

Group A

Argentina

Head coach:  Sergio Hernández

Mexico

Head coach:  Nolan Richardson

Panama

Head coach:  Vicente Duncan

Puerto Rico

Head coach:  Manolo Cintron

Uruguay

Head coach:  Alberto Espasandín

Group B

Brazil

Head coach:  Lula Ferreira

Canada

Head coach:  Leo Rautins

United States

Head coach:  Mike Krzyzewski

Venezuela
  
Head coach:  Nestor Salazar

Virgin Islands

Head coach:  Tevester Anderson

References
FIBA Archive
LatinBasket

2007
squads